Everton José Modesto Silva (born 4 August 1988), known as Everton Silva, is a Brazilian footballer who plays as a right back. He is currently free agent.

Career
Born in Rio de Janeiro, Everton signed with Flamengo in the beginning of 2009 to act as a cover-up member of the club's first team. His debut for his new club was in a 2–2 draw against Boavista on the 2009 Rio de Janeiro State League.

After a good 2009 season as Leonardo Moura substitute Flamengo announced that with investors' help Everton would stay in the club in 2010.

Honours
Flamengo
Série A: 2009
Campeonato Carioca: 2009

References

External links
Player Profile @ Flamengo.com.br 

1988 births
Living people
Footballers from Rio de Janeiro (city)
Brazilian footballers
Association football defenders
Campeonato Brasileiro Série A players
Campeonato Brasileiro Série B players
Campeonato Brasileiro Série C players
Campeonato Brasileiro Série D players
Friburguense Atlético Clube players
CR Flamengo footballers
Associação Atlética Ponte Preta players
Boavista Sport Club players
Duque de Caxias Futebol Clube players
Atlético Clube Goianiense players
ABC Futebol Clube players
Associação Chapecoense de Futebol players
Paysandu Sport Club players
Avaí FC players
Red Bull Brasil players
Joinville Esporte Clube players
Ceará Sporting Club players
Esporte Clube São Bento players